Kalkandu is a 2014 Indian Tamil film written and directed by A. M. Nandakumar. The film features Gajesh and Dimple Chopade in the lead roles, and was released in October 2014.

Plot synopsis 
A demanding father pressures his son into attending medical school, despite his protestations that he does not wish to study medicine. However, due to a mix up at the admissions office, the man's life changes forever.

Cast

Gajesh as Karthik
Dimple Chopade as Karthika
Akhil as Vignesh
Ganja Karuppu as Azhappan
Manobala as Principal Kamalnath
Swaminathan as Ramanathan
Nancy Jennifer as Porkodi 
T. P. Gajendran as Doctor
Sriranjini
Mayilswamy
Mahanadi Shankar
Muthuraman
Bonda Mani

Production
The film gained media attention prior to release, owing to the lead actor Gajesh's debut. He is the son of actor-dancer Anand Babu and grandson of comedian Nagesh. Following the appearance of late actor Nagesh's animation in Kochadaiiyaan (2014), the director insisted on having a sequence in his film, where all three generations of the family appear in one scene through computer imagery. The film was shot mainly in Tamil Nadu, in places such as Tiruchi and Kanyakumari.

Release
The film had a limited release across Tamil Nadu on 31 October 2014, owing to the presence of bigger budget films at the box office. It opened to mixed reviews with a critics noting the film "is the kind of story that Tamil cinema had beaten to death in the 90s." Another reviewer noted that the film had a dated feel and called it "excruciatingly long".

References

External links

2014 films
Films shot in India
2010s Tamil-language films